"Give You Up" is a song by English recording artist Dido, as the first single from her fifth studio album Still on My Mind, Dido's first single in six years. The song was released on 22 January 2019. It became Dido's fifth number one on the US Billboard Dance Club Songs chart in June 2019.

Reception
Jon Blistein of Rolling Stone wrote that the song "boasts a simple arrangement that finds Dido crooning over steady piano plunks, while an atmospheric blend of backing vocals, white noise and kick drums provides texture and warmth".

Chart performance 
Thanks to an array of remixes, "Give You Up" became Dido's fifth number one on the US Billboard Dance Club Songs chart for the week dated June 22, 2019. This marked Dido's first number one in nearly 15 years, since "Sand in My Shoes" topped the chart in 2004.

Music video 
The music video of the song was released on 19 February 2019, directed by Sophie Muller.

Track listings
Digital download 1
"Give You Up" (Edit) – 3:19

Digital download 2
"Give You Up" (Mark Knight Remix) (Edit) – 3:10
"Give You Up" (Mark Knight Remix) – 5:57

Digital download 3
"Give You Up" (Laibert Remix) (Edit) – 4:03
"Give You Up" (Laibert Remix) – 5:59

Credits and personnel
 Dido – vocals
 Si Hulbert – production, engineering, mixing, programming, instruments
 Dee Adam – production, engineering, mixing, programming, instruments
 Joseph William Bernie – additional vocals
 Miles Showell – mastering

Charts

Weekly charts

Year-end charts

Release history

References

2019 singles
2019 songs
Dido (singer) songs
Music videos directed by Sophie Muller